is a Japanese former basketball player and the current assistant coach of the Toyama Grouses in the Japanese B.League. He played college basketball for Osaka Sangyo University. He was selected by the Osaka Evessa with the 14th overall pick in the 2005 bj League draft.

Head coaching record

|-
|-
| style="text-align:left;"|Bambitious Nara
| style="text-align:left;"|2018
|26||12||14|||| style="text-align:center;"|6th in B2 Western|||-||-||-||
| style="text-align:center;"|-
|-
| style="text-align:left;"|Bambitious Nara
| style="text-align:left;"|2018-19
|60||22||38|||| style="text-align:center;"|4th in B2 Western|||-||-||-||
| style="text-align:center;"|-
|-

References

1973 births
Living people
Akita Isuzu/Isuzu Motors Lynx/Giga Cats players
Bambitious Nara coaches
Iwate Big Bulls players
Japanese basketball coaches
Kyoto Hannaryz players
Nishinomiya Storks players
Osaka Evessa players
SeaHorses Mikawa players
Shiga Lakes coaches
Shiga Lakes players
Sun Rockers Shibuya players
People from Higashiōsaka
Sportspeople from Osaka Prefecture
Toyama Grouses coaches